Threshold is the sixth studio album by Swedish heavy metal band HammerFall, released on 18 October 2006. The album entered the Swedish charts at number one, staying on the chart for eight weeks. It was the band's first number 1 album since Renegade in 2000. It is currently the last HammerFall studio album with guitarist Stefan Elmgren and bassist Magnus Rosén, as Rosén left the band in 2007 and Elmgren left in 2008.The cover artwork was created by Samwise Didier.

The guitar solo of "Howlin' with the 'Pac" is essentially a reworked version of the one from "Hearts on Fire". As with several songs on the previous album, the song "Dark Wings, Dark Words" is inspired by A Song of Ice and Fire.

Track listing

Music videos
The song "Natural High" was made into a music video depicting Hector the Knight battling vampires in a decrepit castle; he managed to kill most of the vampires with his hammer, but one of them escapes, leaving Hector by himself. The video itself is a montage alternating between the band and the action, which is shot in live-action and complemented with CGI.
The song "The Fire Burns Forever" was also made into a music video. The band recorded it with some of the Swedish participants in the European Athletics Championships.

Single "The Fire Burns Forever"
"The Fire Burns Forever" was also released as a single and only available as a download between 6 August and 6 September 2006, exclusively at the ITunes Store and Nuclear Blast Musicshop. Hammerfall and the athletes also performed "The Fire Burns Forever" at the official opening of the Championships on 6 August in Gothenburg, Sweden.

Personnel
 Joacim Cans – lead vocals
 Oscar Dronjak – guitars, backing vocals, keyboards. programming
 Stefan Elmgren – guitars, backing vocals, keyboards, programming
 Magnus Rosén – bass
 Anders Johansson – drums
Backing vocals by Oliver Hartmann, Rolf Köhler, Olaf Zenkbiel, Mats Rendlert, Joacim Lundberg, Markus Sköld, and Johan Aremyr

Chart positions

 Sweden: #1
 Germany: #15
 Austria: #30
 Switzerland: #32
 France: #192

References

External links
 Lyrics at Darklyrics
 Official band website
 Album information

2006 albums
HammerFall albums
Nuclear Blast albums
Albums produced by Charlie Bauerfeind